Mahesh Sahoo is an Indian politician. He was elected to the Lok Sabha, lower house of the Parliament of India from Dhenkanal, Odisha in the 2019 Indian general election as a member of the Biju Janata Dal.

References

Living people
India MPs 2019–present
Members of the Odisha Legislative Assembly
Lok Sabha members from Odisha
Biju Janata Dal politicians
Year of birth missing (living people)
People from Dhenkanal